KETH-TV (channel 14) is a religious television station in Houston, Texas, United States, airing programming from the Trinity Broadcasting Network (TBN). It is owned and operated by TBN's Community Educational Television subsidiary, which manages stations in Texas and Florida on channels allocated for non-commercial educational broadcasting, and serves as the subsidiary's flagship station. KETH-TV's studios (and CET's general offices) are located on South Wilcrest Drive in the Alief section of Houston. The station's transmitter is located near Missouri City, in unincorporated northeastern Fort Bend County.

History

The station was founded on October 12, 1983, and first signed on the air on July 16, 1987.

Programming
As with other Community Educational Television stations, KETH carries almost all of the TBN network schedule, as well as some locally produced programs: a local version of Praise the Lord, Up with the Son and Joy in Our Town. In addition to programming from TBN, the station airs educational programming to prepare local students for the General Educational Development (GED) test to fulfill the requirements under their license service.

Subchannels

References

External links
TBN official website
KETH website

ETH-TV
Television channels and stations established in 1987
Trinity Broadcasting Network affiliates
1987 establishments in Texas